Borkum is an island and a municipality in the Leer District in Lower Saxony, northwestern Germany. It is situated east of Rottumeroog and west of Juist.

Geography

Borkum is bordered to the west by the Westerems strait (which forms the border with the Netherlands), to the east by the Osterems strait, to the north by the North Sea, and to the south by the Wadden Sea. It is the largest and westernmost of the East Frisian Islands in the North Sea, due north of the Dutch province of Groningen.

The island was formed in 1863 by two previously separate islands which were still separated by a shallow water. The seam between the former eastern and western parts is called Tüskendör ("through in between").

Climate 
Borkum is the only East Frisian island that is under the influence of the North Sea all year round thanks to its  distance from the mainland. The maritime climate is influenced by the Gulf Stream and the west wind zone with correspondingly high humidity throughout the year. This ensures varied weather with much sun and wind but also occasional rain and showers.
Compared to the mainland, there is a climate with much milder winters and cooler summers without extremely cold or hot days. This is due to the buffering effect of the sea, which warms up slowly in spring and summer, but stores the warm temperatures longer in autumn.

History
Mentioned as Burchana fabaria (island of beans) by both Strabo and Pliny the Elder, Borkum by the time of Charlemagne was part of a larger island called Bant, which consisted of the present day islands of Borkum, Juist, and the western part of Norderney.

In 1484, Bant passed to the Earls of East Frisia, who developed trade, and the island became known as a centre of piracy and whaling. By 1781, violent storms in the 18th century divided Bant into three islands. As whaling decreased, the inhabitants became impoverished, and many left, with the island's population falling from 852 in 1776 to 406 by 1811. The first tourists arrived on the island in 1834, and the local economy improved as a tourist resort.

In Mexico as I saw it, published by Thomas Nelson, Mrs Alec Tweedie, writing in 1911 about a trip of 1900 to Mexico, compares the brick roads of Monterrey with those of Borkum, "the one spot on earth from which Jews are banished". This had to do with the aggressive and successful campaign of German tourists to keep Borkum free from Jewish visitors, as celebrated in the antisemitic "Borkum-Lied".

In 1910, British officers Captain Bernard Frederick Trench and Lieutenant Vivian H. Brandon were imprisoned for espionage for photographing the military installations on the island.

On 19 and 20 December 1934, Wernher von Braun launched "Max" and "Moritz", the two prototypes of the A2-rocket.

In 1944, the island was the site of the massacre of 7 American POWs. After the war, these murders were prosecuted in the Borkum Island war crimes trial.

Transport
The island is partially car-free. Off-season, driving by car is permitted everywhere, otherwise there are car-free zones. The only town on the island is also called Borkum. There is an airfield in the Tüskendör area. Borkum is served by ferries from Emden, Germany and Eemshaven, the Netherlands. The Borkumer Kleinbahn narrow-gauge railway connects the harbour and the town of Borkum.

See also
List of ferry boats of the East Frisian Islands

References

External links

Official site 
Borkum-Unterkünfte - Borkum Accommodations 
Web-Directory with the topic Borkum  
Borkum-Perle - Holiday Home Rental Agency 
 
Web-Directory with the topic Borkum's summer residence  

 
Islands of Lower Saxony
East Frisian Islands
Towns and villages in East Frisia
Leer (district)
Germany–Netherlands border crossings
Antisemitism in Germany